is a railway station in the city of Matsumoto, Nagano, Japan, operated by the private railway operating company Alpico Kōtsū.

Lines
Endō Station is on the Kamikōchi Line and is 12.7 kilometers from the opposing terminus of the line at Matsumoto Station.

Station layout
The station has one ground-level side platform serving one bi-directional track. The station is not attended.

Adjacent stations

History
The station opened on 26 September 1922.

Passenger statistics
In fiscal 2016, the station was used by an average of 27 passengers daily (boarding passengers only).

Surrounding area
Hata Jinja

See also
 List of railway stations in Japan

References

External links

 

Railway stations in Japan opened in 1922
Railway stations in Matsumoto City
Kamikōchi Line